The Ahmedabad Urban Development Authority is a civilian government body responsible for overseeing and sanctioning construction and infrastructure development across the suburbs of the city of Ahmedabad, in the state of Gujarat in India. The office of AUDA is at Usmanpura, Ashram Road, Ahmedabad. Recently the area of working of AUDA has been limited due to merger of 18 Gram Panchanyats of Ahmedabad district with the Ahmedabad Municipal Corporation. AUDA completed many works in the metro region of Ahmedabad.  Bhupendra Patel is the current chairman of AUDA.

AUDA is coming up with a state-of-the-art office on Ashram Road, Ahmedabad. The 22-storeyed structure will be on the lines of the Green Building Concept and will be called the Ahmedabad Habitat Centre.

Objective 

Ahmedabad Urban Development Authority consists of a group of non bureaucratic individuals and agencies who are responsible for planning Infrastructure development in Indian cities. The individuals are specialised in various aspects of town planning activities.

Activities 

Ahmedabad Urban Development Authority planners are responsible for the following.

 Ensuring that Town planning schemes are implemented.

 Creating and implementing development plan of master plan for notified areas.

 Creation and implementation of urban area development initiatives like affordable housing, slum dwellers development.

 Implementation of Local Area Plan for the improvement of existing areas.

 Modernising building laws.

 Transit oriented development is promoted.

 Inclusion of conversion of heritage buildings in local area plans.

 Social and economic development planning.

Challenges 

Ahmedabad Urban Development Authority planners are faced with following challenges:

 Meeting housing needs of urban settlers.

 Investment on development initiatives.

 Resolving drinking water issues.

 Resolving sanitation issues.

References

External links
 Official website of Ahmedabad Urban Development Authority (AUDA)

Government of Ahmedabad
State urban development authorities of India
State agencies of Gujarat
1978 establishments in Gujarat
Government agencies established in 1978